Giovannona Coscialunga disonorata con onore (internationally released as Giovannona Long-Thigh) is a 1973 commedia sexy all'italiana directed by Sergio Martino. The film reteams the two main actors of the 1972 film Quel gran pezzo dell'Ubalda tutta nuda e tutta calda and, as with the previous film, it was very successful commercially.  The original title reprises Lina Wertmüller's Mimì metallurgico ferito nell'onore.

Plot
When a newly appointed judge shuts down a cheese factory for pollution violations, its owner, La Noce, bribes a monsignor to fix the problem. He discovers the judge has a liking for other men's wives. La Noce sends his assistant, Albertini, to hire a woman to pretend to be La Noce's wife. Albertini finds a virginal-looking prostitute with a dirty mouth. The girl's train ride from Rome to Sicily is filled with mix-ups but they hope that once she's in Sicily, La Noce's plan to compromise the judge will succeed. All the characters come together to create a comedic storyline....La Noce, his real wife, the whore, her pimp, Albertini, the judge, his wife, and his jealous secretary.

Cast 
Edwige Fenech: Giovannona "Cocò" Coscialunga 
Pippo Franco: Ragionier Mario Albertini
Vittorio Caprioli: Onorevole Pedicò
Gigi Ballista: Commendatore La Noce
Riccardo Garrone: Robertuzzo
Francesca Romana Coluzzi: Mary
Vincenzo Crocitti: Conducente del treno
Nello Pazzafini: Franceschino
Gino Pagnani: Hearse Driver helping Albertini
Danika La Loggia: Signora La Noce
Patrizia Adiutori: Luisella

References

Further reading
 Giuliano Pavone, Giovannona Coscialunga a Cannes: storia e riabilitazione della commedia all'italiana anni '70, Tarab, 1999

External links

1973 films
Commedia sexy all'italiana
Films directed by Sergio Martino
Films set in Sicily
Films about prostitution in Italy
Films about politicians
Films scored by Guido & Maurizio De Angelis
1970s sex comedy films
1973 comedy films
1970s Italian films